The Anne & Max Tanenbaum Community Hebrew Academy of Toronto, also known as CHAT and TanenbaumCHAT, is a private Jewish high school in Toronto, Ontario, established in 1960. As of 2012, it was the largest private high school in Canada. A second campus of TanenbaumCHAT existed from 2000 to 2017 in the York Region, known as the Kimel Family Education Centre.

History
The Community Hebrew Academy of Toronto was founded in 1960 by the Associated Hebrew Schools of Toronto, in whose building CHAT was initially housed. CHAT moved to the former Wilmington Public School facility owned by the Toronto District School Board in 1979.

In September 2000, a second campus, called CHAT Richmond Hill, was opened on Wright Street in Richmond Hill to serve students living north of Steeles Avenue. In June 2006, it was announced that the school would be renamed the Anne & Max Tanenbaum Community Hebrew Academy of Toronto (TanenbaumCHAT), in honour of a large gift from the estate of Dr. Anne Tanenbaum. TanenbaumCHAT's north campus moved in September 2007 to the Lebovic Jewish Community Campus on Bathurst Street in Vaughan. The Wilmington Avenue location was renamed the TanenbaumCHAT Wallenberg Campus after Raoul Wallenberg in May 2008, after a school-wide vote, but that name was dropped after the amalgamation of the two campuses in September 2017.

On March 6, 2017, it was announced that the northern campus would close and consolidate with the Wallenberg Campus at the beginning of the September 2017 school year.

Feeder patterns
Jewish day schools that feed into TanenbaumCHAT include Associated Hebrew Schools, Bialik Hebrew Day School, The Toronto Heschel School, The Leo Baeck Day School, Robbins Hebrew Academy, and Netivot HaTorah Day School. TanenbaumCHAT offers a New Stream program for students who have come from the public school system or who did not otherwise previously attend a Jewish elementary school.

Notable alumni
 Oren Eizenman (born 1985), ice hockey player
 Diane Flacks, playwright
 Zach Hyman (born 1992), professional hockey player with the Edmonton Oilers
 Jeremy Podeswa (born 1962), Emmy Award-nominated director
 Moshe Ronen, lawyer and Jewish community leader

References

External links
Tanenbaum Community Hebrew Academy of Toronto

1960 establishments in Ontario
Educational institutions established in 1960
High schools in Toronto
Private schools in Toronto
Jewish Canadian history
Jewish schools in Canada
Jews and Judaism in Ontario
Pluralistic Jewish day schools